Bristol Manor Farm Football Club is an English football club based in Bristol, England. The club is affiliated to the Gloucestershire County FA.

History

Bristol Manor Farm Football Club was formed for the 1960–61 season. After just one season, the club was disbanded but was reformed and began playing again in the 1962–63 season. Their current home The BS3 Services Stadium used to be the site of the Port of Bristol Authority Sports & Social Club but when they moved to new premises 1965, Manor Farm took it over. The pitch at The BS3 Services Stadium was once notorious for its sloping surface but work has been undertaken in recent years to eliminate the slope. With seating and floodlights added since 1980, the club now boasts excellent facilities alongside a spacious clubhouse.
 
Having a permanent base enabled the club to apply successfully to join the Somerset Senior League where they were to progress rapidly through the divisions before deciding to advance further to the Western League in 1977.
 
The club joined the First Division for the 1977–78 season and remained there until the 1982–83 season when they won the First Division championship and gained promotion to the Premier Division. They remained there until relegation under Pete McCall's management team in 2001–02 but regained their Premier status just two seasons later in 2003/04 under Shaun Bond and Nicky Johns. In 1983–84 they reached the final of the G.F.A. Challenge Trophy where they lost to then Hellenic League side Shortwood United. The trophy did make its way to the Creek in 1987–88 and has been won on a further three occasions by the club.
 
 
Main stand at The Creek.
The 2011–12 season saw the club win its first double when they took both the GFA Challenge Trophy and the Toolstation League Les Phillips League Cup back to Sea Mills.
 
Lee Lashenko become the new manager at the start of the 2013–14 season and quickly made an impact in the FA Cup, overcoming Oldland Abbotonians, Lymington Town and Corsham Town to reach the Second Qualifying Round, equaling their best ever performance in the competition. Unfortunately, they were unable to go one better and lost to Bridgwater Town 1-2 in a replay at Fairfax Park. The club continued to fight for top spot in the league and applied for promotion. The club finished second but were unsuccessful in their promotion bid when Larkhall Athletic were accepted into the Southern League. The second-placed finish was the best in the club's history. It also saw the team break the club records for the most goals scored in a season and the fewest goals conceded.
 
The 2015–16 season left the club with mixed feelings as on one hand they managed to get to the Quarter-Final of the FA Vase narrowly going out away to eventual winners Morpeth Town. On the other hand, while they finished third in the Western League, again they just missed out on promotion to the Southern League by one place. They did, however, win the GFA County Challenge Trophy for the second time in succession and the fourth time overall with a record 9-2 win over Lydney Town.
 
In the 2016–17 season, Bristol Manor Farm were finally successful in gaining promotion to the Southern League, winning the Western League by quite a distance. They also had another successful run in the FA Vase where they went out in the Fifth Round Proper to Semi-Finalists Bromsgrove Sporting.
 
The Farm finished their first season in the eighth tier in ninth place, falling away towards the end after troubling the top six places all season.

Staff
First Team Manager: 
Lee Lashenko
Club Secretary:
Rachael Caswell
Assistant manager: Grantley Dicks
Physio: Luke Stevens
Coach(s): Mike Bryant
Photographer: Alex Barnham
Scarecrow: Tony Parsons

Club rivals 
Bristol Manor Farm's main rivals are considered to be Yate Town and Mangotsfield United, both from the northern outskirts of Bristol. With all three clubs playing in the Southern Football Leagues since 2017, fixtures among the three have been seen by some fans as a contest to claim the title of Bristol's third club and tend to attract higher than usual attendances.

Honours
Western Football League Premier Division
Champions: 2016–17
Runners-up: 2013–14
Western Football League Division One
Champions: 1982–83

Cup Honours
Gloucestershire Football Association Challenge Trophy
 Winners: 1987-88, 2011–12, 2014–15, 2015-16
Western Football League Cup:
 Winners: 2011-12

Seasons

 Season abandoned due to COVID-19 Pandemic*

Records
FA Cup
Third Qualifying Round 2018–19, 2019–20, 2020-21
FA Trophy
First Round Proper 2022–23
FA Vase
Quarter Finals 2015-16
Biggest victory
10–0 versus Devizes Town in the Les Phillips Cup. Saturday 19 November 2016.
Biggest Defeat
0-11 versus Bristol City in the annual Community Match at The Creek on Sunday 9 July 2017.
Record Attendance
1417 versus Bristol City in a pre-season friendly. Sunday 9 July 2017

Notable past players
Alan Crawford
Danny Maye
David Mehew
Marek Piszczek (brother of Łukasz Piszczek)

References

External links
Official Website
Official Twitter

Football clubs in Bristol
Western Football League
Association football clubs established in 1960
1960 establishments in England
Football clubs in England
Southern Football League clubs
Bristol and Suburban Association Football League